Myrtle Scharrer Betz (1895–1992) was an American writer who wrote about life on Caladesi Island in the early 1900s.

Betz was the daughter of the 1880s homesteader Henry Scharrer At age 87, Betz wrote the book, Yesteryear I Lived in Paradise telling of her life on the barrier island.

Yesteryear I Lived In Paradise was first published in 1985 in a loose-leaf binding made possible by the interest and generosity of 105 friends of Myrtle Betz. This edition was presented to Myrtle as a surprise gift for her 90th birthday.

References

1895 births
1992 deaths
People from Pinellas County, Florida
20th-century American memoirists
American women memoirists
20th-century American women